Matthew Labine (May 5, 1959 – September 1, 2017) was an American soap opera writer, the son of Claire Labine and the brother of Eleanor Labine Mancusi.

Early life 
Labine received a Bachelor of Arts in economics from Yale University in 1981 and was on the rowing team, where he won several rowing championships. After college, played on two US National teams and was a finalist in the US Olympic trials in 1980 and 1984.

Career
Labine and his mother created Heart & Soul, a planned General Hospital spinoff. However, ABC Daytime passed on the show for a more cost-effective show.

Writing 

General Hospital
 Associate Head Writer: 1993–1996

Guiding Light
 Associate Head Writer: August 2000 – July 2001

One Life to Live
 Co-Head Writer: January 1997 – March 1998

Ryan's Hope
 Associate Head Writer: 1988 – January 13, 1989

Rowing 

Labine was a rowing coach at Fairfield University from 2010.

Awards and nominations
Daytime Emmy Awards

WINS
 (1995; Best Writing; General Hospital)

Writers Guild of America Award

WINS
 (1989 & 1990 seasons; Ryan's Hope)
 (1995 & 1996 seasons; General Hospital)

NOMINATIONS 
 (2002 season; Guiding Light)

References 

1959 births
2017 deaths
American soap opera writers
American male television writers
American male writers
Place of birth missing
American male screenwriters
Daytime Emmy Award winners
Writers Guild of America Award winners
Place of death missing